Dance4life is an international youth initiative to raise awareness and promote prevention of HIV/AIDS.

Dance4Life
 Jael van der Heijden, Managing Director
 Anika de Groot, Director Fundraising and Communications

History
dance4life was founded in 2003 by two international marketers - Dennis Karpes and Ilco van der Linde - who were struck by the force of the HIV pandemic. They shared a passion to use their commercial expertise to turn this problem around. They envisioned a world united in pushing back HIV and AIDS, with one message: start dancing, stop AIDS.

dance4life has become an international youth movement. Its purpose is to create social change and empower young people to take action to push back HIV and AIDS. dance4life is about the belief that HIV and AIDS can and will be stopped the moment young people have the power to stand up and say no to unsafe sex.

Starting in three countries, and having expanded to 30 countries in 2012, dance4life has grown and shaped into a worldwide youth movement.

Since then dance4life has achieved the participation of 600,000 young teens in the "heart connection tour", 300,000 agents4change adolescents, the distribution of 3 million dance4life condoms to youth, over €3 million raised for local HIV prevention projects in the Global South, and a worldwide hit known as the "dance4life (song)" anthem by Tiësto featuring Maxi Jazz between 2003 and 2006.
It has been estimated that by the Saturday before World AIDS Day 2014, the foundation will have created a total of one million agents4change. An agent4change is a young person who has participated in the dance4life "schools4life" and is involved in pushing back HIV and AIDS.

In 2004, during the first dance4life episode, thousands of people in the Netherlands, South Africa and Indonesia participated. dance4life chose a song called "Breathe Sunshine" by Dino Sofos as their official anthem. The song was also remixed by DJ Paul van Dyk, released on vinyl and CD worldwide and was played by Paul van Dyk and at all the dance4life world events over the course of 2004 and 2005.

As of May 2006, DJ Tiësto is the official worldwide ambassador for the dance4life foundation. He recorded a track with Maxi Jazz (of Faithless) of the same name. The song peaked for five weeks in the Dutch Singles Chart, peaking at number five in Belgium, six in Finland and also charting in the UK and Germany.

In 2009 supermodel Doutzen Kroes became an ambassador. She visited dance4life projects in Tanzania, The United States, The Netherlands and Thailand and raised money through auctions for dance4life.

Schools4Life
Schools4life has nothing to do with books, preaching or homework, instead it is about dance, music, media, events, drumming, videos and taking the responsibility of living a life under protection. Using the language of people younger than 25 years the school begins with the Heart Connection Tour in which each school is visited by the dance4life tour team; The team is composed of dancers, musicians, peer educators and young people living with HIV. Students later take the responsibility by participating in "skills4life" which deals with the teaching of what is HIV and what it does to your body, other topics are its prevention, sexuality, drug abuse, and the rights of the teens, communication, and decision making. "Act4life" stands for taking action as a volunteer, fund raising or the spreading of the information as it is important to make people aware. To conclude schools4life, at the dance4life event which takes place every two years on the Saturday before World AIDS Day, on November 29, 2008 the agents of change are present at the event live or via satellite.

Ambassadors
 Doutzen Kroes, international dance4life ambassador
 Tiësto, international dance4life ambassador

 Alexander Shelley, dance4life Germany
 Alexey Vorobyov, dance4life Russia
 Aly & Fila, dance4life Egypt
 , dance4life Netherlands
 DJ Black Coffee and SHANA, dance4life South Africa
 Dj Willber Luno Phoenix, dance4life Bangladesh
 Black Mango Music, dance4life South Africa
 Dare Art Alade, dance4life Nigeria
 Don Diablo, dance4life Netherlands
 Ebby Sykes, dance4life Tanzania
 DJ Feel, dance4life Russia
 Fid Q, dance4life Tanzania
 Jan Kooijman, dance4life Netherlands
 Jesse Voorn, dance4life Netherlands
 DJ Jimmy Jatt, dance4life Nigeria
 Kaffy and her Imagneto Dance Group, dance4life Nigeria
 Katung, Maureen and Gideon, dance4life Nigeria
 DJ Khaled Abdel Rahman, dance4life Egypt

 Marco V, dance4life Netherlands
 Maxi Jazz, dance4life Netherlands
 Metis, dance4life UK
 Nikkie Plessen, dance4life Netherlands
 The Partysquad, dance4life Netherlands
 Sander van Doorn, dance4life Netherlands
 Sied van Riel, dance4life Netherlands
 Sandrien, dance4life Netherlands
 Stella Damascus, dance4life Nigeria
 Tim Westwood, dance4life UK
 Unique Sisters, dance4life Tanzania
 Vladimir Posner, dance4life Russia
 Wust El Bala, dance4life Egypt
 Yousra, dance4life Egypt
 Zahi Hawass, dance4life Egypt
 Zoë Xenia, dance4life Netherlands
 Zolani Mkiva, dance4life South Africa
 Ana Stanic, dance4life Serbia

NCOs
 Barbados -  Dance4Life Barbados has been a registered not-for profit organisation since 2013 and is its own NCO. It was established in 2009 by its original NCO -  Associates for International Development  to empower and strengthen leadership and social development  participation  of young people in Barbados, by co-ordinating and implementing the Dance4Life empowerment model in Barbados to ultimately, through cross-fertilisation of skills and transference of lessons learned, extend to the wider Caribbean.
 Germany - Dance4Life Deutschland e.V., which works closely with organisations such as Deutsche Aids Hilfe e.V. and in some federal states, Deutsche Stiftung Weltbevölkerung. Dance4Life Deutschland e.V. is supported by SV Werder Bremen, Die Deutsche Kammerphilharmonie Bremen, Royston Maldoom.
 Ireland - Irish Family Planning Association (IFPA) who work close with the Sexual Health Centre in Cork. Irish Aid is the chief funder, the organisation in Ireland is also supported financially by the International Planned Parenthood Federation (IPPF), United Nations Population Fund (UNFPA) and Durex Ireland.
 Kenya - Africa Alive! is the Kenyan NCO, which educates and provides the youth with the skills necessary to push back HIV and AIDS. It works in five African countries and its regional office is in Nairobi, Kenya. It counts with the support from the Johns Hopkins University Center for Communication Programs (JHUCCP).
 Mexico - United Nations Population Fund (UNFPA), it promotes the right of every woman, man and child to enjoy a life of health and equal opportunity. It consists of four organisations: MEXFAM, AVE de México, ELIGE, and VIVIR.
 Moldova - ICF "AIDS Foundation East-West" (AFEW-Ukraine) is a Dutch NGO in Eastern Europe and Central Asia, The work began in Moldova in 2004. Dance4Life Moldova is working with many partners to make the projects successful, including: Ministry of Education and Youth; Ministry of Health; Country Coordination Mechanism; National AIDS Centre; Republican Dermato Venereal Dispenser; National Scientific Centre of Preventive Medicine; UNAIDS Moldova; SIDA; UCIMP TB/SIDA; NGO National Health Journalists Communication Network; Credinta Association (PLWH); Centre of Young Journalists Moldova (CTJM); Association of Young Trainers from Moldova; NGO Gender Doc M; Representation in Moldova of TV and radio company MIR; and radio Station Kiss FM.
 Netherlands - STOP AIDS NOW! is an organisation which is a partnership between AIDS Fonds and four Dutch organisations providing international development aid.
 Russia - The FOCUS-MEDIA Foundation uses social marketing techniques, education programs, and mass media campaigns based on promoting options and personal responsibility.
 Sierra Leone - The National Concept Owner is Student Partnerships Worldwide that recruits and trains young adults (aged 18–28) as volunteer Peer Educators, to lead programmes addressing urgent health and environmental issues in Africa and Asia.
 South Africa - Dance4Life South Africa is a registered not-for profit Section 21 Company that has been established especially to co-ordinate, develop and organise the Dance4Life concept in South Africa. The office is located in Durban, South Africa and it works with organisations like God's Golden Acre, and DramAide; Companies like The Three Cities Hotel Group and Gear House support Dance4Life South Africa.
 Tanzania - The National Concept Owner is Student Partnerships Worldwide that recruits and trains young adults (aged 18–28) as volunteer Peer Educators, to lead programmes addressing urgent health and environmental issues in Africa and Asia.
 Turkey - UNFPA is the National Concept Owner of Dance4Life Turkey. Y-PEER, the Youth Peer Education Network launched by the UNFPA which deals with young people in broad areas of adolescent sexual and reproductive health in Central and Eastern Europe, Central Asia, the Middle East, and both North and East Africa. The Positive Living Association and the Turkish Education Association help this foundation.
 Uganda - The National Concept Owner is Student Partnerships Worldwide that recruits and trains young adults (aged 18–28) as volunteer Peer Educators, to lead programmes addressing urgent health and environmental issues in Africa and Asia.
 United Kingdom - The National Concept Owner is Student Partnerships Worldwide that recruits and trains young adults (aged 18–28) as volunteer Peer Educators, to lead programmes addressing urgent health and environmental issues in Africa and Asia.
 USA - Student Partnerships Worldwide USA is concentrated in Washington DC, It works in rural communities in South Asia and sub-Saharan Africa. It work with national partners, Metro TeenAIDS (MTA) and Red Zebra.
 Vietnam - The World Population Foundation has an office in Hanoi which holds the right that sex is a free and well-considered choice for all men, women and young people in the world. It is sponsored by TRG International and Durex and partners Rosette event organising company and Thang Long Song music and dance theater.
 Zambia - The National Concept Owner is Student Partnerships Worldwide that recruits and trains young adults (aged 18–28) as volunteer Peer Educators, to lead programmes addressing urgent health and environmental issues in Africa and Asia.
 Zimbabwe - The National Concept Owner is Student Partnerships Worldwide that recruits and trains young adults (aged 18–28) as volunteer Peer Educators, to lead programmes addressing urgent health and environmental issues in Africa and Asia.

References

External links
 dance4life international website
 dance4life UK website

HIV/AIDS organizations
Medical and health organisations based in the Netherlands
Dance organizations